Donna Dresch is an American punk rock musician, perhaps best known as founder, guitarist and bass guitarist of Team Dresch.

Dresch has been actively involved in the queercore scene since the 1980s, as the creator of the fanzine Chainsaw and contributor to several other zines such as Outpunk and J.D.s, as well as contributing and being featured on the front cover of issue five of Deke Nihilson and Tom Jennings' zine Homocore.  Additionally, she was a contributor to Tobi Vail's influential proto-Riot Grrrl fanzine, Jigsaw and Tammy Rae Carland's zine I (heart) Amy Carter. In 1992, she appeared in the cult film The Yo-Yo Gang, by G.B. Jones.

She founded the queercore independent record label Chainsaw Records in the early 1990s. Shortly after, she joined forces with Jody Bleyle and Kaia Wilson to form Team Dresch. Once drummer Marcéo Martinez was added to the line-up, the group began recording. The first single was released in 1994 on Kill Rock Stars. Their debut album in 1994, Personal Best and its follow-up, Captain My Captain, were released jointly by Chainsaw Records and Jody Bleyle's label Candy Ass Records. Team Dresch performs live and the members are interviewed in the documentary film She's Real, Worse Than Queer by Lucy Thane.

Since its inception, Chainsaw Records has housed many well-known bands such as Tracy and the Plastics and Sleater-Kinney.

In 2004, she founded a new band, Davies vs. Dresch. In 2006, Team Dresch reunited and began touring again.

Other appearances
Dresch has appeared on many other artists' recordings, including Amy Ray's Prom; Third Sex's Card Carryin'  (as producer, engineer and mixer); Phranc's Goofyfoot EP (bassist); Some Velvet Sidewalk's Shipwreck (guitarist and bassist); Hazel's Are You Going to Eat That? (producer); and Fifth Column's 36-C (guitarist).

Dresch temporarily replaced Van Conner in the Screaming Trees, and had a brief stint as bassist in Dinosaur Jr., accompanying them on their US and Australian tour in 1990. She collaborated with Slim Moon in the 1980s Olympia-based garage band Nisqually Delta Podunk Nightmare, and played bass in the Olympia grunge/punk band Dangermouse. She has also worked with Rastro! (with Jen Smith), The Go Team, Mary Lou Lord, and Lois.

Publications
McDonnell, Evelyn; Powers, Ann, editors: Rock She Wrote, Delta, N.Y.C., US,  (1995)
Darms, Lisa, editors: "Riot Grrrl Collection"  (2015)

Guest appearances
Amy Ray – Guitar  "Prom" LP
Lois –Bass  "Strumpet" LP
Lois - Bass "Page Two" 7"
Some Velvet Sidewalk - Bass  "Shipwreck" LP
Fifth Column – Guitar  "36c" LP
Dinosaur Jr. – Bass  "The Wagon" 7"
Phranc – Bass  "Goofyfoot" 10"
Mary Lou Lord – Guitar  "Some Jingle Jangle Morning" 7"

See also
Chainsaw Records
List of LGBT people from Portland, Oregon
Team Dresch

References

External links
Chainsaw Records, Dresch's record label
Interview with Donna Dresch
 The Zines of Donna Dresch 

American punk rock bass guitarists
American women guitarists
American lesbian musicians
Living people
Third-wave feminism
Riot grrrl musicians
Screaming Trees members
Women bass guitarists
Year of birth missing (living people)
Queercore musicians
Women punk rock singers
Team Dresch members
Fifth Column (band) members
Feminist musicians
20th-century LGBT people
21st-century LGBT people
21st-century American women